The Civil Engineering Standard Method of Measurement (commonly known as CESMM3) sets out a procedure for the preparation of a bill of quantities for civil engineering works, for pricing and for expression and measurement of quantities of work.

CESMM3 includes 26 main clauses of work:

References

 

Engineering-related lists